Zinc finger protein 497 is a protein that in humans is encoded by the ZNF497 gene.

References

Further reading